The community of Indians in Oman includes Indian expatriates in Oman, as well as Omani citizens of Indian origin or descent.

History
Although Indian migration to Oman is apparently for the purpose of spreading their commercial activities and mutually sharing the profits, their mutual good relations are believed to have existed as early as the 7th century. It was however, in 15th century since when the Indian merchants had started undertaking commercial activities in Muscat in a quite systematic manner. As an important port-town in the Gulf of Oman, Muscat attracted foreign tradesman and settlers, such as the Persians, the Balochs and Gujaratis.

The Indian community then consisted essentially of traders and financiers from Kutch and Sindh. Some of the earliest Indian immigrants to settle in Oman were the Bhatias of Kutch in Gujarat, who have had a powerful presence in Oman dating back to the 16th century. It was during the 19th century that some Khojas reached there, and who are presently well-integrated in Oman; some of them hold even ministerial positions. A few Indian families predominantly from Gujarat which have been living in Oman since many centuries, have developed their enterprises into the colossal business houses.

Admittedly, the settlement of the Indian migrants in Oman has become possible only because of Omani government's liberal policy in granting its citizenship to foreign nationals. It is conceivably the only Arab country in Arabian Peninsula, which has taken such dynamic initiative, which has proved to be enormously beneficial to them in many respects. Any person irrespective of his religion or race, who has completed at least 20 years in Oman, is treated as eligible to apply for its citizenship. That's why about a thousand Indians have so far became Omani citizens.

Religion

Oman holds an exceptional position among all the Persian Gulf countries in terms of Basic Law of the State promulgated in December 1996, which guarantees the freedom of worship to all its inhabitants, irrespective of their religious beliefs. Such liberal policy of the government has made it possible that presently there are two Hindu temples where congregations are held regularly. One of these temples is more than a hundred years old. The Hindus have been granted the rights of cremation as per their religious rites. There are nearly four temporary gurudwaras (2 in Muscat, 1 in Salalah and Sohar each), which have been built in the labour camps. Oman also has seven churches for various Christian sects living in this country. Recently the Omani government has allowed the Indian Community to build a permanent gurudwara and a temple in Oman of the likes that are seen in India itself (The current temples and gurudwaras are small, temporary, and bounded to a compound).

Demographics
The Indian community in Oman is regarded to be among the most prosperous communities in the country. At present, Indians constitute almost 20% of Oman's total population of 2.3 million (2010 census), as they are the largest expatriate community in the country. There are 448,000 Indian migrant workers in Oman. The Indians in Oman belong to various professions and businesses. Almost 25% of them are unskilled workers, 30% of them semi-skilled, and 35% are skilled ones. The other 10% consist of professionals such as engineers, bankers, financial experts, managers/executives and businessmen. There are around 2,000 Indian doctors in Oman, who work in different hospitals and healthcare centers of the country.

Some of them are working with the local newspapers and magazines; particularly those being published in English. The majority of Indians in Oman come from Kerala, accounting for 60% of all Indian nationals in the country.

Education

There are a number of Indian curriculum and community-run schools in Oman, including
Indian School (Darsait)
Indian School (Al-Ghubra)
Indian School (Al Wadi Al Kabir)
Indian School (Muscat)
Indian School, Sohar
Indian School, Seeb|Indian School (Seeb)
Indian School, Nizwa
Indian School, Ibri
Indian School, Ibra

The local Omanis are prohibited from studying in these schools.

See also
Hinduism in Oman

References

Indians In Oman  Community 

Ethnic groups in Oman
 
Indian diaspora in Oman